Martha Lake or Lake Martha may be one of several places in the United States:

Populated place
 Martha Lake, Washington, a census-designated place

Lakes
 Martha Lake (California), a lake in Kings Canyon National Park
 Martha Lake (Colorado), a lake in Jackson County, Colorado
 Lake Martha (Florida)
 Lake Martha (Minnesota)
 Martha Lake (Montana), a lake in Flathead County, Montana
 Lake Martha (South Dakota)
 Lake Martha (Utah), a lake near the Brighton Ski Resort area of Big Cottonwood Canyon